"Vulnerable" is a song by Swedish pop music duo Roxette, released as the fifth and final single from their fifth studio album Crash! Boom! Bang!, while simultaneously acting as the lead single from the duo's 1995 compilation album Rarities.

"The Sweet Hello, the Sad Goodbye" had previously been released as the B-side on the duo's 1991 single "Spending My Time". Earlier that year, in April, it had been released as the lead single from Thomas Anders' (of Modern Talking fame) second solo album, Whispers.

Composition and style
The song was written by Per Gessle in December 1990, although it would not be recorded by the band until April 1993 at Mayfair Studios in London. In the liner notes of their 1995 greatest hits compilation Don't Bore Us, Get to the Chorus!, Gessle indicated that the song was "written a week too late for the Joyride album and it didn't really suit the Tourism sessions, so we kept it in the drawer until we started the Crash!-project in London."

According to Ultimate Guitar, the track is an alternative pop ballad, with a moderate tempo of 134 beats per minute. The verse is composed of two repetitions of an E–G♯m–A–F♯m–B sequence, with the final note amended to a C♯ on the second repetition. The chorus consists of three repetitions of a F♯–F♯maj7–B–C♯ sequence, followed by one shortened bar of F♯–C♯–F♯.

Critical reception
AllMusic editor Bryan Buss described the song as "apathetic". Music Week gave it two out of five, noting that "Per Gessle takes over vocal dutied for the new ballad from the Swedish duo."

Commercial performance
"Vulnerable" became the second-biggest hit from the parent album in the duo's native country, peaking at number twelve and spending almost three months on the Swedish Singles Chart. Although lead single "Sleeping in My Car" debuted at number one in Sweden, the title track stalled at number seventeen, and "Fireworks" spent a sole week on the chart, peaking at number 34. The album's fourth single, "Run to You", became the duo's first single since 1988's "I Call Your Name" to not enter the Swedish top fifty.

The song spent almost three months on the German Singles Chart, eventually peaking at number 71 on its sixth week. In the UK, "Vulnerable" peaked at number 44, ending a run of seventeen consecutive top forty singles on the UK Singles Chart. It performed marginally better in Scotland, peaking at number 41.

Formats and track listings
All songs written by Per Gessle.

 7" single and cassette (Australia 8651514 · UK TCEM369)
 "Vulnerable" (Single Edit) – 4:30
 "The Sweet Hello, the Sad Goodbye" – 4:49

 CD Single (Australia · Europe 8651522)
 "Vulnerable" – 4:30
 "The Sweet Hello, the Sad Goodbye" – 4:49
 "Vulnerable" (Demo, 28 December 1990) – 4:44
 "I'm Sorry" (Demo, 18 August 1993) – 3:25

 UK CD Single (CDEM369)
 "Vulnerable" – 4:30
 "The Sweet Hello, the Sad Goodbye" – 4:49
 "Vulnerable" (Demo) – 4:44

Personnel
Credits adapted from the liner notes of Don't Bore Us, Get to the Chorus!

 Per Gessle – lead and background vocals, mixing
 Marie Fredriksson – background vocals
 Jonas Isacsson – acoustic and electric guitars
 Anders Herrlin – programming and engineering
 Mats Holmquist – string arrangement and conducting
 Clarence Öfwerman – keyboards, programming, string arrangement, production and mixing
 Alar Suurna – engineering and mixing
 Stockholms Nya Kammarorkester  – orchestration

Charts

References

External links
 
 
 

1990s ballads
1995 singles
Roxette songs
Music videos directed by Jonas Åkerlund
Songs written by Per Gessle
Pop ballads
Rock ballads